WMCF-TV (channel 45) is a religious television station in Montgomery, Alabama, United States, owned and operated by the Trinity Broadcasting Network (TBN). The station's studios are located on Mendel Parkway West in Montgomery, and its transmitter is located on the city's east side.

History

The station was founded in 1985 as the Montgomery market's first general-entertainment independent station, before switching to TBN in 1986.

Subchannels
 The station's digital signal remained on its pre-transition UHF channel 46, using PSIP to display the station's virtual channel as its former UHF analog channel 45.

References

External links
Official website

Trinity Broadcasting Network affiliates
Television channels and stations established in 1985
MCF-TV
1985 establishments in Alabama